Level 4 or Level Four or Level IV may refer to:

Technology
 Level 4, a level of automation in a self-driving car (see Autonomous car#Classification)
Level 4, the transport layer in the OSI model of computer communications

Gradation
Level 4 Biosafety level
Level 4 trauma center

Music
LVL IV album by Future Leaders of the World 2004
Level 4 (Globe album)

Other uses 
 Level 0 coronavirus restrictions, see COVID-19 pandemic in Scotland#Levels System
 STANAG 4569 protection level